Live in Philly 2010 is the first live performance released by the hard rock band Halestorm, and the second album released overall by them. The album was made available for pre–orders on October 21, 2010, and released November 16, 2010. This live performance was recorded at the TLA in Philadelphia, Pennsylvania on April 30, 2010.

Track listing (CD)

Track listing (DVD)
 "Intro"
 "It's Not You"
 "What Were You Expecting"
 "Innocence"
 "Bet U Wish U Had Me Back"
 "Love/Hate Heartbreak"
 "I'm Not An Angel"
 "Familiar Taste of Poison"
 "Boom City"
 "Nothing to Do with Love"
 "Dirty Work"
 "I Get Off"
 "Tell Me Where It Hurts"
 "Better Sorry Than Safe"

References

2010 live albums
Halestorm albums
Atlantic Records live albums